James Vaughan Owen (born 14 January 1991) is a Welsh footballer who plays for Caernarfon Town. He began his career with Chester City, but left in January 2010 when the club experienced financial difficulties.

Playing career 
Born in Caernarfon, Owen is a product of Chester's youth policy and has been capped by Wales at under 17 level. He made his debut in The Football League for Chester away at Port Vale as a late sub when Chester were down to nine men, with his first starting appearance coming at Accrington Stanley in April 2009. He ended the season with seven league appearances to his name, as Chester suffered relegation from Football League Two.

In January 2010, he cancelled his contract with the club by mutual consent. After leaving the club, Owen joined Conference rivals Wrexham on trial, scoring in a 3–2 friendly win over Welsh Premier League side Airbus UK Broughton on 20 January. He failed to gain a contract but later signed for Barrow in the same division. Owen spent three seasons with Barrow, but left when the club was relegated to Conference North at the end of the 2012–13 season.

He joined Welsh Premier League side Airbus UK in August 2013, spending three years with the club before joining Connah's Quay Nomads. He left the club at the end of the 2021–22 season and joined hometown club Caernarfon Town.

Career statistics

References

External links 
James Owen career stats at BarrowAFC.com
 

1991 births
Living people
People from Caernarfon
Sportspeople from Gwynedd
Welsh footballers
Association football midfielders
Chester City F.C. players
Barrow A.F.C. players
English Football League players
National League (English football) players
Wales youth international footballers
Airbus UK Broughton F.C. players
Connah's Quay Nomads F.C. players
Cymru Premier players
Caernarfon Town F.C. players